Harriett Sarah Gilbert (born 25 August 1948) is an English writer, academic and broadcaster, particularly of arts and book programmes on the BBC World Service. She is the daughter of the writer Michael Gilbert. Besides World Book Club on the World Service, she also presents A Good Read on BBC Radio 4.  Before the programme was cancelled, she also presented the BBC World Service programme The Strand.

Biography
Born in Hornsey, London, Gilbert was educated at the French Lycée in London and at a succession of boarding schools. "Growing Pains" was her contribution to Truth, Dare or Promise (1985), a collection of autobiographical writing. After graduating from drama school, her first acting role was as Mother Elephant in a production of Rudyard Kipling's Just So Stories for primary schools. The other peak of her success was playing a secretary murdered on page five of a BBC radio drama. She also worked as a nanny, a waitress, an artist's model and a clerk-typist. She began to write in her twenties.

She nominated A High Wind in Jamaica by Richard Hughes, first read to her by her father when she was eight, as a life-changing book. The one piece of advice her father, the writer Michael Gilbert, gave her about writing was: "For God's sake, don't use adverbs." Her brother is the journalist Gerard Gilbert of The Independent.

Career
From 1983 to 1988 she was literary editor of the New Statesman and, before that, of City Limits (1981–83). She has also contributed to Time Out, The Guardian, and The Washington Post.

From 1992 she lectured in the Department of Journalism at the City University, London, where until 2008 she was also the programme director of the MA Creative writing (novels) course.

She wrote two short animated films, directed by Marjut Rimminen: The Stain (1992) and Many Happy Returns (1997).

Gilbert presents one programme on BBC World Service radio: World Book Club, broadcast on the first Saturday in each month. About presenting for the World Service, Gilbert has said: "I think I'm doing the dream job, I just love it, and I can't think of anywhere else I'd like to be."

Gilbert has introduced the World Service arts documentary series Close Up. In 2008 she stood in as presenter of the arts programme The Ticket. She previously presented the World Service's dedicated book programme The Word. Besides this she has presented arts programmes for BBC Radio 4, BBC Radio 3 and BBC Four television.

In 2011 she replaced Sue MacGregor as presenter of the Radio 4 book programme A Good Read.

Writer and broadcaster Michael Rosen called her "one of the very best presenters of arts programmes on radio or TV". The Financial Times said of her, "the splendid Harriett Gilbert [...] painfully shows up certain would-be arty Radio 4 colleagues".

She is the author of six novels, including Hotels With Empty Rooms and The Riding Mistress. Her non-fiction books include A Women's History of Sex and The Sexual Imagination from Acker to Zola. She scripted the short animated film The Stain (1991) viewable at the Internet Archive.

Although she has not published a novel since 1983 she hopes to return to writing.

She was a judge of the 2011 Independent Foreign Fiction Prize.

Bibliography
I Know Where I've Been – Harper and Row (USA) (1972). 
Hotels With Empty Rooms – Harpercollins (1973). 
An Offence Against the Persons – Hodder & Stoughton (1974). 
Given the Ammunition – Harper and Row (1976).  (published in the UK as Tide Race – Constable (1977). )
Running Away - Harper and Row (USA) (1979).  – a novel for young adults
The Riding Mistress – Constable (1983). 
"Growing Pains" in Liz Heron (ed.), Truth, Dare or Promise: Girls Growing Up in the Fifties – Virago (1985).  – autobiographical essay
A Women's History of Sex  – Pandora (1987) (illustrated by Christine Roche). 
The Sexual Imagination: From Acker to Zola – A Feminist Companion  – Jonathan Cape (1993).  (published in the US as Fetishes, Florentine Girdles, and Other Explorations into the Sexual Imagination  – Harpercollins (1994). )
Writing for Journalists – Routledge (1999) (with Wynford Hicks and Sally Adams).

References

Elizabeth Sleeman (2003) International Who's Who of Authors and Writers 2004, Routledge,

External links
World Book Club homepage

Biography on the BBC website
BBC World Service – Meet the Presenter – Video profile
Interview from 2003

1948 births
Living people
BBC people
BBC World Service presenters
English women journalists
English writers
Alumni of Rose Bruford College
English women novelists
English women non-fiction writers